Milford pink granite, also known as Milford granite or Milford pink is a Proterozoic igneous rock located in and around the town of Milford, Massachusetts, covering an area of approximately , as mapped by the USGS. It is also sometimes referred to as Braggville granite, for several quarries in the neighboring village of Braggville, Massachusetts.

From 1870 to 1940, the town of Milford became famous for the "pink" variety of this stone, prized as a building material. According to local legend, the granite was "discovered" in the early 1870s by two brothers, James and William Sherman at Rocky Woods in Milford.
At its peak, over 1,000 men labored in dozens of quarries in Milford and nearby Hopkinton. A sample of Milford Pink is on display at the Smithsonian Institution.

Milford pink granite is quarried by the Fletcher Granite Company, at their Lumber Street quarry in Hopkinton.

Description

The biotite is typically in clots or short streaks. It is commonly locally gneissic. The color of the stone is governed mainly by its feldspars, pink from the potash and green from the soda lime feldspar.

Examples of use

Massachusetts
Bancroft Memorial Library, Hopedale (1898)
Boston Public Library, McKim Building, Boston (1895)
Flour and Grain Exchange Building, Boston (1892)
Memorial Hall, Milford (1884)
Town Hall, Hopedale (1886)
Worcester City Hall, Worcester (1898)

New York City
American Museum of Natural History (1869)
Brooklyn Museum, Brooklyn (1895)
General Post Office Building (1912)
Pennsylvania Station (1910)
University Club of New York (1899)

Washington, D.C.
Eccles Federal Reserve Building (1937)
First Division Monument (1924)
Zero Milestone (1923)

Other
Allegheny County Courthouse, Pittsburgh, Pennsylvania (1888)
Cullum Hall of The United States Military Academy at West Point, New York (1898)
John J. Glessner House, Chicago, Illinois (1887)
Pennsylvania Station, Baltimore, Maryland  (1911)
Singapore Changi Airport, Changi, Singapore (2002)

See also
Fall River granite
Norcross Brothers

References

External links
Boston Public Library construction photos, showing Milford quarries

Granite
Geology of Massachusetts